Maison Guiette also known as Les Peupliers, is a house in Antwerp, Belgium, designed by Le Corbusier in 1926 and built in 1927. It was the studio and living quarters of René Guiette, a painter and art critic. One of the Franco-Swiss architect's lesser-known works, it is an early example of the International Style.

Rene Guiette asked Le Corbusier to design a house modelled on the 1925 Pavilion de l'Esprit Nouveau. Guiette drew lifelong inspiration from the house using gouache and experimental photography 

The house and the Guiette artwork was the subject of an exhibition at the 9H gallery London.

In July 2016, the house and several other works by Le Corbusier were inscribed as UNESCO World Heritage Sites.

References

Houses in Belgium
Le Corbusier buildings
International Style (architecture)